The 2012 Indianapolis Enforcers season was the second season for the Continental Indoor Football League (CIFL) franchise.

For the 2012 season, the Enforcers will play their home games at The SportZone in Indianapolis, Indiana after playing the 2011 season as a travel team. The team removed defensive coordinator Tiny Lee, and replaced him with Brian Hendricks, who will also serve as the wide receivers coach. The team also announced the signing of CIFL veteran quarterback, Ron Ricciardi to help lead the offense. Ricciardi brought instant stability to the offense throwing 5 touchdowns in his first game coming off the bench. Those 5 touchdowns were more than any Enforcers quarterback had thrown all season in 2011.

On March 31, 2012 the Enforcers recorded their first ever franchise victory, second due to 2011 forfeit victory over the Port Huron Predators, with a 40-34 win over the Chicago Vipers.

Players

Free agents

Signings

Final roster

Regular season

Regular season

Standings

Regular season results

Week 1: vs Dayton Silverbacks

The first quarter opened with Dayton scoring in the first two minutes of the game on a seven-yard run by Marcus Fails. The extra point by Jeff  Hubbard failed and Dayton led 6-0. With a minute left in the first quarter, Bruce Peters ran in from four yards out and Dayton was up 12-0. The Enforcers scored with 55 seconds left in the quarter when Jamie Barnes caught a 23-yard pass from quarterback Anthony Duckett. The PAT was good by Pavel Polochanin.
 
Dayton continued with a second quarter. Halfway through the quarter, Evan Sawyer scored on a 1-yard run. Jeff Hubbard added the PAT and Dayton led 19-7. With 5:18 to play in the half, Trey Jackson recorded a safety and the Silverbacks were up 21-7. The first half scoring closed with 4:07 remaining on Sawyer's 23-yard run. Peters ran in for the two-point conversion and Dayton led 29-7 at halftime.
 
The second half belonged to the Silverbacks as well. Dayton scored six points in the third to lead 35-7 after three and added two more scores in the fourth to win going away 48-7. Sawyer had a memorable CIFL debut as he recorded five touchdowns (four rushing and one passing). Duckett, on the other, had one to forget, as he set an Enforcers, and CIFL, record with 7 interceptions. The 7 interceptions by the Silverbacks set a CIFL record for a single game. The previous record had been 6, held by the Cincinnati Commandos who set the mark in 2011 against Indianapolis.

Week 2: vs Evansville Rage

With the victory, the Rage collected their first ever franchise victory. The Rage were led by quarterback Nate Samas who put the first points on the board with a four-yard keeper under two minutes into the game.  Samas also added five touchdowns through the air. Rage running back Joe Casey played a versatile role in the victory as well.  Casey racked up two rushing touchdowns and one receiving touchdown. Wide receiver Dusten Dubose compiled three receiving touchdowns from quarterback Nate Samas and receiver Terrence Wright  added one receiving touchdown. During the game, the Enforcers set a franchise record for points scored in a game, with 35. Their previous high had been 19.

With the loss, the Enforcers fell to 0-2.

Week 3: vs Saginaw Sting

The Sting set a CIFL record by scoring 91 point in a single game. The previous high has been the Rochester Raiders in a 90-45 win over Lehigh Valley Outlawz on May 7, 2006.

Coaching staff

See also 
 The Forum at Fishers
 2011 Indianapolis Enforcers season

References

2012 Continental Indoor Football League season
Indianapolis Enforcers
Indianapolis Enforcers